Josef Klieber (1 November 1773, Innsbruck - 11 January 1850, Vienna) was an Austrian painter and sculptor.

Life and work 
His father, was a church sculptor and gave him his first art lessons. In 1785, he began attending the drawing school in Innsbruck then, in 1792, went to Vienna with his father, hoping to find an apprenticeship. Their efforts failed, but Josef remained in Vienna. After a period of living in poverty, he was on the verge of enlisting in the army, when his father called him home to help with a project. Taking  the money he earned there, he went back to Vienna and was able to obtain an apprenticeship with the sculptor, .

By 1810, he was working for Prince Johann I Joseph, for whom he produced a large number of sculptures, suitable for adorning his buildings in and around Vienna. Occasionally, he was engaged by the architect, Josef Kornhäusel, to provide decorative ornaments for his designs. He became well known through this work. As a result, he was appointed to the Privy Council and, in 1814, provisional Director of the engraving and metal cutting school at the Academy of Fine Arts. The following year, he was named permanent Director; a post he held until 1845. His students there included Franz Bauer, Anton Dietrich and István Ferenczy. 

During his career, he received several awards, including the Great Gold Civil Medal. His preferred sculpting material was sandstone and his works were generally realistic in nature. He was known for working rapidly, which had a detrimental effect on some of his smaller sculptures. 

He died in Vienna's Wieden district and was interred at the Wiener Zentralfriedhof. In 1879, a street and a park were named after him  in Perchtoldsdorf.

His son, was a painter and lithographer. The watercolorist and portrait painter, was his grandson.

Selected works

Sources 
 
 
 Neuigkeits-Welt-Blatt vom 25. Oktober 1910 Nr. 117, Seite 9.

External links 

1773 births
1850 deaths
Artists from Innsbruck
Austrian sculptors
Academy of Fine Arts Vienna alumni
Sandstone sculptures